The XVII Island Games (also known as the 2017 NatWest Island Games for sponsorship reasons) was held in Gotland, Sweden, from 24 June to 30 June 2017. This was the second time that the island has hosted the games, the first being in 1999.

Participating islands
23 island entities of the IIGA, from Europe, South Atlantic and the Caribbean area, competed in these Games. Rhodes originally planned to take part, but later withdrew on 31 May 2017 due to the financial situation in Greece.

 (Host)

 
 Menorca

 St. Helena

 Ynys Môn

Sports
Numbers in parentheses indicate the number of medal events contested in each sport.

Medal table
Updated at June 30, 2017

References

External links
Island Games 2017

 
Island Games
Multi-sport events in Sweden
Sport in Gotland County
Island Games
Island Games
Island Games